The Rural Municipality of Grassy Creek No. 78 is a rural municipality (RM) in the Canadian province of Saskatchewan within  Division No. 3.

History 
The RM of Grassy Creek No. 78 incorporated as a rural municipality on January 1, 1913.

Demographics 

Government 
The RM of Grassy Creek No. 78 is governed by an elected municipal council and an appointed administrator that meets on the third Wednesday of every month. The reeve of the RM is Michael Sutter while its administrator is Kathy Collins. The RM's office is located in Shaunavon. The RM shares this office with the RM of Wise Creek.

Transportation 
Highway 13—serves Ponteix, Saskatchewan

See also 
List of communities in Saskatchewan
List of rural municipalities in Saskatchewan

References 

Grassy Creek
 
Division No. 4, Saskatchewan